Basil (Ocimum basilicum , also called great basil, is a culinary herb of the family Lamiaceae (mints). It is a tender plant, and is used in cuisines worldwide. In Western cuisine, the generic term "basil" refers to the variety also known as sweet basil or Genovese basil. Basil is native to tropical regions from Central Africa to Southeast Asia. In temperate climates basil is treated as an annual plant, however, basil can be grown as a short-lived perennial or biennial in warmer horticultural zones with tropical or Mediterranean climates.

There are many varieties of basil including sweet basil, Thai basil (O. basilicum var. thyrsiflora), and Mrs. Burns' Lemon (O. basilicum var. citriodora). O. basilicum can cross-pollinate with other species of the Ocimum genus, producing hybrids such as lemon basil (O. × citriodorum) and African blue basil (O. × kilimandscharicum).

Etymology 
The name "basil" comes from the Latin , and the Greek , meaning "royal/kingly plant", possibly because the plant was believed to have been used in production of royal perfumes. The Latin name has been confused with basilisk, as it was supposed to be an antidote to the basilisk's venom.

Description 

Basil is an annual, or sometimes perennial, herb used for its leaves. Its leaves are richly green and ovate, but otherwise come in a wide variety of sizes and shapes depending on cultivar. Basil grows a thick, central taproot. Its flowers are small and white, and grow from a central inflorescence, or spike, that emerges from the central stem atop the plant. Unusual among Lamiaceae, the four stamens and the pistil are not pushed under the upper lip of the corolla, but lie over the inferior lip. After entomophilous pollination, the corolla falls off and four round achenes develop inside the bilabiate calyx.

Phytochemistry 
The various basils have such distinct scents because the volatile aromatic compounds vary with cultivars. The essential oil from European basil contains high concentrations of linalool and methyl chavicol (estragole), in a ratio of about 3:1. Other constituents include: 1,8-cineole, eugenol, and myrcene, among others. The clove scent of sweet basil is derived from eugenol. The aroma profile of basil includes 1,8-cineole and methyl eugenol. In this species eugenol is synthesised from coniferyl acetate and NADPH.

Distribution and habitat 
Basil is native to India and other tropical regions stretching from Africa to South East Asia, but has now become globalized due to human cultivation.

Taxonomy 

The exact taxonomy of basil is uncertain due to the immense number of cultivars, its ready polymorphy, and frequent cross-pollination (resulting in new hybrids) with other members of the genus Ocimum and within the species. Ocimum basilicum has at least 60 varieties, which further complicates taxonomy.

Cultivars 
Most basils are cultivars of sweet basil. Most basil varieties have green leaves, but a few are purple, such as, 'Purple Delight'.

 Anise basil, Licorice basil, or Persian basil (O. basilicum 'Liquorice')
 Cinnamon basil (Ocimum basilicum 'Cinnamon')
 Dark opal basil (Ocimum basilicum 'Dark Opal')
 Globe basil, dwarf basil, French basil (Ocimum basilicum 'Minimum')
 Lettuce leaf basil (Ocimum basilicum 'Crispum')
 Purple basil (Ocimum basilicum 'Purpurescens')
 Rubin basil (Ocimum basilicum 'Rubin')
 Thai basil (Ocimum basilicum thyrsifolium)

Hybrids 
 African blue basil (Ocimum basilicum × O. kilimandscharicum)
 Lemon basil (Ocimum basilicum × O. americanum)
 Spice basil (Ocimum basilicum × O. americanum), which is sometimes sold as holy basil
 Greek basil (Ocimum basilicum var. minimum)

Similar species 
Some similar species in the same genus may be commonly called "basil", although they are not varieties of Ocimum basilicum.

 Camphor basil, African basil (O. kilimandscharicum)
 Clove basil, also African basil (Ocimum gratissimum)
 Holy basil (Ocimum tenuiflorum, formerly known as O. sanctum)

Cultivation

Growing conditions 
Basil is sensitive to cold, with best growth in hot, dry conditions. It behaves as an annual if there is any chance of a frost. However, due to its popularity, basil is cultivated in many countries around the world. Production areas include countries in the Mediterranean area, those in the temperate zone, and others in subtropical climates.

In Northern Europe, Canada, the northern states of the U.S., and the South Island of New Zealand, basil grows best if sown under glass in a peat pot, then planted out in late spring/early summer (when there is little chance of a frost); however, it can also thrive when planted outside in these climates. Additionally, it may be sown in soil once chance of frost is past. It fares best in well-drained soil with direct exposure to the sun.

Although basil grows best outdoors, it can be grown indoors in a pot and, like most herbs, will do best on a sun-facing windowsill, kept away from extremely cold drafts. A greenhouse or row cover is ideal if available. It can, however, even be grown in a basement under fluorescent lights. Supplemental lighting produces greater biomass and phenol production, with red + blue specifically increasing growth and flower bud production. UV-B increases the volatiles in O. basilicum essential oil, which has not been reproducible in other plants, and so may be unique to the genus or even to this species.

Basil plants require regular watering, but not as much attention as is needed in other climates. If its leaves have wilted from lack of water, it will recover if watered thoroughly and placed in a sunny location. Yellow leaves towards the bottom of the plant are an indication that the plant has been stressed; usually this means that it needs less water, or less or more fertilizer. Basil can be propagated reliably from cuttings with the stems of short cuttings suspended in water for two weeks or until roots develop.

Pruning, flowering, and seeding 

Once a stem produces flowers, foliage production stops on that stem, the stem becomes woody, and essential oil production declines. To prevent this, a basil-grower may pinch off any flower stems before they are fully mature. Because only the blooming stem is so affected, some stems can be pinched for leaf production, while others are left to bloom for decoration or seeds. Picking the leaves off the plant helps promote growth, largely because the plant responds by converting pairs of leaflets next to the topmost leaves into new stems.

Once the plant is allowed to flower, it may produce seed pods containing small black seeds, which can be saved and planted the following year. If allowed to go to seed, a basil plant will grow back the next year.

Diseases 
Basil suffers from several plant pathogens that can ruin the crop and reduce yield. Fusarium wilt is a soil-borne fungal disease that will quickly kill younger basil plants. Seedlings may be killed by Pythium damping off. A common foliar disease of basil is gray mold caused by Botrytis cinerea; it can cause infections post-harvest and is capable of killing the entire plant. Black spot can be seen on basil foliage and is caused by the fungi genus Colletotrichum. Downy mildew caused by Peronospora belbahrii is a significant disease, as first reported in Italy in 2004. It was reported in the U.S. in 2007 and 2008.

Non-pathogenic bacteria found on basil include Novosphingobium species.

Uses

Culinary
Basil is most commonly used fresh in recipes. In general, it is added last, as cooking quickly destroys the flavor. The fresh herb can be kept for a short time in plastic bags in the refrigerator, or for a longer period in the freezer, after being blanched quickly in boiling water.

Leaves and flowers 
The most commonly used Mediterranean basil cultivars are "Genovese", "Purple Ruffles", "Mammoth", "Cinnamon", "Lemon", "Globe", and "African Blue". Basil is one of the main ingredients in pesto, an Italian sauce with olive oil and basil as its primary ingredients. Many national cuisines use fresh or dried basils in soups and other foods, such as to thicken soups. Basil is commonly steeped in cream or milk to create flavor in ice cream or chocolate truffles.

Lemon basil has a strong lemony smell and flavor due to the presence of citral. It is widely used in Indonesia, where it is called  and served raw as an accompaniment to meat or fish.

Seeds 
In Kashmir, the Ramadan fast is often broken with babre beole, a sharbat made with basil seeds.

Folk medicine 
Basil is used in folk medicine practices, such as those of Ayurveda or traditional Chinese medicine.

Toxicity to pests and pathogens

Insecticide and insect repellent 
Studies of the essential oil have shown insecticidal and insect-repelling properties, including potential toxicity to mosquitos. The essential oil is found by Huignard et al. 2008 to inhibit electrical activity by decreasing action potential amplitude, by shortening the post hyperpolarization phase, and reducing the action frequency of action potentials. In Huignard's opinion this is due to the linalool and estragole, the amplitude reduction due to linalool, and the phase shortening due to both.

Callosobruchus maculatus, a pest which affects cowpea, is repelled by the essential oil. The essential oil mixed with kaolin is both an adulticide and an ovicide, effective for three months in against C. maculatus in cowpea. The thrips Frankliniella occidentalis and Thrips tabaci are repelled by O. basilicum, making this useful as an insect repellent in other crops. The pests Sitophilus oryzae, Stegobium paniceum, Tribolium castaneum, and Bruchus chinensis are evaluated by Deshpande et al. 1974 and '77.

Nematicide 
The essential oil is found by Malik et al. 1987 and Sangwan et al. 1990 to be nematicidal against Tylenchulus semipenetrans, Meloidogyne javanica, Anguina tritici, and Heterodera cajani.

Bacterial and fungal inhibition 
The essential oil of the leaf and/or terminal shoot is effective against a large number of bacterial species including Lactiplantibacillus plantarum and Pseudomonas spp. The essential oil of leaf and/or terminal shoot is also effective against a large number of fungal species including Aspergillus spp., Candida spp., Mucor spp., and Geotrichum candidum.

Culture 

There are many rituals and beliefs associated with basil. The ancient Egyptians and ancient Greeks believed basil would open the gates of heaven for a person passing on. Jewish folklore suggests it adds strength while fasting. However, Herbalist Nicholas Culpeper saw basil as a plant of dread and suspicion.

In Portugal, dwarf bush basil is traditionally presented in a pot, together with a poem and a paper carnation, to a sweetheart, on the religious holidays of John the Baptist (see ) and Saint Anthony of Padua. In Giovanni Boccaccio's 14th century Decameron, the fifth story of the narrative's fourth day involves a pot of basil as a central plot device. This famous story inspired John Keats to write his 1814 poem "Isabella, or the Pot of Basil", which was in turn the inspiration for two paintings of the Pre-Raphaelite Brotherhood: John Everett Millais's Isabella in 1849 and in 1868 the Isabella and the Pot of Basil by William Holman Hunt.

Basil has religious significance in the Greek Orthodox Church, where it is used to sprinkle holy water. The Bulgarian Orthodox Church, Serbian Orthodox Church, Macedonian Orthodox Church and Romanian Orthodox Church use basil to prepare holy water and pots of basil are often placed below church altars. Some Greek Orthodox Christians even avoid eating it due to its association with the legend of the Elevation of the Holy Cross.

See also 
 Basileus
 List of basil cultivars

References

External links 
 Basil: Knowing and Growing from the New York Botanical Garden

Articles containing video clips
Flora of Asia
Flora of New Guinea
Herbs
Indian spices
Insect repellents
Mediterranean cuisine
Medicinal plants of Asia
Ocimum
Taxa named by Carl Linnaeus